Mariusz Mowlik (born May 19, 1981, in Poznań) is a Polish retired footballer. Besides Poland, he has played in Austria and Greece. Co-owner of 11-Football Players agency.

Career

Club
His football career began in Poznań. He attended a football school SKS 13 Poznań. After graduating, he played in such clubs as 1922 Lechia Kostrzyn, Polonia Środa Wielkopolska, Sokół Pniewy and Patria Buk.

In 1999, he joined Lech Poznań. In 2003, he was loaned out to Polonia Warsaw. After returning to Poznań, he became a regular at Lech for the next three seasons and won the Polish Cup with the team in the 2003–04 season.

In mid-2006, he signed with Dyskobolia Grodzisk Wielkopolski. After just one league appearance, he left the club to join Austrian second division team SC Austria Lustenau. In 2007, he signed a contract with PAE Aigaleo in the Greek Superleague. In early 2008, FIFA terminated his contract with the Greek club.

Mowlik returned to Poland and signed a contract with second-division then Polonia Warsaw. From 2008 until 2011 he represented ŁKS Łódź. In the 2010–11 season, Mariusz led ŁKS to promotion to Ekstraklasa as team captain. He was released on 6 June 2011.

On 13 June 2011, he joined Miedź Legnica. After retiring, he held the role of sporting director until April 2017.

In 2018 opened a sport agency: 11-Football Players which represents footballers all over the world.

International
He was a part of Poland national football team and played one match in 2004 against United States in Chicago.

Personal life
He is the son of Piotr Mowlik, ex-footballer, goalkeeper and national team player and cousin of professional player David Topolski.

References

External links
 
 

1981 births
Living people
Polish footballers
Poland international footballers
Polish expatriate footballers
Ekstraklasa players
I liga players
II liga players
2. Liga (Austria) players
ŁKS Łódź players
Lech Poznań players
Dyskobolia Grodzisk Wielkopolski players
Polonia Warsaw players
Miedź Legnica players
SC Austria Lustenau players
Egaleo F.C. players
Expatriate footballers in Greece
Expatriate footballers in Austria
Footballers from Poznań
Association football defenders